Rugby Southland (formerly the Southland Rugby Football Union) is the provincial rugby union who govern the Southland region of New Zealand. Their headquarters are at Rugby Park Stadium in Invercargill, which is also the home ground of the union's professional team, the Southland Stags who compete in the Mitre 10 Cup Championship Division and challenge for the Ranfurly Shield.

Despite their proud history, no Southland team has ever won the top division of the New Zealand National Provincial Championship since organised competition began in 1976. However, they have won the NPC second division title five times and held the Ranfurly Shield seven times, most recently in 2011 where they defended the shield twice before losing it to Taranaki. Southland also plays for the Donald Stuart Memorial Shield against rivals Otago in what is the longest tenured provincial rivalry in New Zealand first-class rugby, with 229 matches.

History

Formation and early years
Founded in 1887 after splitting from Otago, Southland and its former stablemate went on to forge what is New Zealand's longest inter-provincial rugby rivalries. The two sides have played more games against each other than any other representative teams in New Zealand. They played their first game against Otago, losing in a close affair. The Southland region already had strong club rugby teams with Invercargill competing in the Dunedin based competition. The Invercargill club had already produced two All Blacks. They were outside back, Henry Braddon and wing forward, James O'Donnell. In 1885 these two players were recognised as Otago All Blacks as they played their rugby for neighbouring province.

It was not until 1896 when Southland hooker, Nisbet McRobie was selected in the New Zealand team to play Queensland. The side won 9-nil and it was McRobie's only game in the 'black jersey', however he occupies a special place in Southland Rugby history as the provinces first of over 50 All Blacks. Billy Stead became the provinces first test All Black in 1903 and also captained the All Blacks 12 times.

Production of talent
Southland is renowned for producing a high number of quality players despite the small population of the province shown by the over 50 All Blacks who have come from Southland. This continued following the war with players such as Leo Connolly and Jack Hazlett followed by Leicester Rutledge and Frank Oliver. But as rugby in New Zealand was organised into structured annual competition to replace tours and series which Southland had played in previously Southland Rugby struggled to retain their local talent. With Southland in the NPC Second Division from 1976, talented Southlanders began heading north in search of top level rugby. Southland continued to produce homegrown talent over 1980s and 1990s which led them to five Second Division titles, namely Brian McKechnie, Steven Pokere, Geoff Valli, Paul Henderson and Simon Culhane who was the shining light for Southland over this period, it was the talent that was lost that continues to haunt Southland fans. Southland at this time was used as a kickstart for many successful players careers. Valli moved to North Auckland in 1981, Pokere left Southland for Auckland in 1984 and Henderson spent what most consider to be his best years as a footballer in Otago from 1987-91. This worsened as Southland neared the millennium and led to embarrassing results where victories were few and far between as Southland was promoted to the NPC First Division after their 1996 championship.

Considered one of Southland's best ever athletes, it pains many Southland fans to think that Jeff Wilson played only a season for Southland whilst still attending Cargill High School before heading to Otago to attend university and play his provincial rugby and cricket both of which he would represent New Zealand in before turning 20, going on to play 60 tests for the All Blacks. Justin Marshall who was Southland's halfback left after the winning the 1994 Second Division title and went on to become one of New Zealand's greatest halfbacks playing 81 All Black tests from 1995-2005 and winning every major trophy in New Zealand rugby excluding a Rugby World Cup. 2002 Southland captain Corey Flynn left the province for Canterbury and the Crusaders in 2003 and went on to play 70 games for Canterbury, 150 for the Crusaders and 15 for the All Blacks which would have been far greater if not for multiple broken arms from 2003-2014.

Others who kickstarted their career in Southland before moving where they became All Blacks Norm Hewitt, Pita Alatini, David Hill and Paul Miller. All Blacks such as Anton Oliver, Damian McKenzie and Mils Muliaina (with the latter going on to become the second ever All Blacks centurion), who left the province for their schooling would not return with rugby's increasing professionalism to represent the province like their family had in the past.

In recent years such as 2021, Ethan De Groot has played three tests for the All Blacks

Southland vs international teams
For a province of its size, Southland's record against international teams is unmatched. Rugby Park has not been a happy hunting ground for foreign sides many of whom have come to grief at the hands of determined Southland sides over the years. Australian national and state sides have had a particularly miserable time in Invercargill, losing on 13 occasions. The British Lions were defeated in 1950 and 1966 and France were put away in 1979 and 1989 along with Italy more recently in 2003.

Ranfurly Shield
Southland were the first South Island province to win the coveted Ranfurly Shield in 1920 when they beat Wellington. Their first shield reign was brief, losing the Shield back to Wellington in 1921 after two defences. They next won the Shield in 1929 off Wairarapa, this time defending it four times before again losing to Wellington. Southland then won the Ranfurly Shield in 1937 and 1938 when they retained the Shield for 12 challenges before losing it to bitter rivals Otago in 1947. With Ranfurly Shield rugby not played from 1939 to 1945 due to World War II, Southland's nine years with the Shield remains the longest in terms of time period although it did reside under a bed for much of this time. The Southland side during this period boasted All Blacks George Purdue, Bill Hazlett, Art Wesney, Les George and All Black Captains Frank Kilby and Brushy Mitchell in the Shield winning sides.

Their next Shield victory over Taranaki in 1959 would be their last for 51 years before the 2009 Southland side broke the drought by beating Canterbury 9-3 in Christchurch. Their six defences of the Shield proved to be some of the more iconic Shield games in the professional era including a 16-12 victory over arch-rivals Otago in front of a sold-out Rugby Park, and a 9-6 victory over Auckland days after the biggest snow storm ever recorded in the province led to fans having to shovel snow off the field the day before the game. After losing the Shield to Canterbury, the Stags again claimed the shield from their South Island rivals in 2011 in their most recent tenure which lasted two games. These Southland sides were not headlined by regular All Blacks like the teams from the 1930s and 1940s, instead they were made up mostly of locally grown talent educated at Southland Boys' High School such as captain Jamie Mackintosh, centurions Jason Rutledge, David Hall, Josh Bekhuis and Tim Boys, and future Scotland international John Hardie.

Name change
In 1998 the Southland Rugby Football Union Incorporated changed its name to Rugby Southland Incorporated

Club rugby
When Robert Galbraith stepped down as the Southland Rugby Football Union secretary the union handed him a donation which the long-serving Southland rugby administrator promptly spent on a shield he donated back to the union as a prize for Invercargill's top club rugby competition. The Galbraith Shield has been the prize for Southland's premier club rugby competition since 1908.

There are six teams currently in Southland's premier competition; Marist,  Blues, Pirates-Old Boys, Star, Woodlands and the Eastern Northern Barbarians whose players come from the clubs in the Eastern/Northern sub union.

Current Senior Clubs:

 Albion Excelsior
 Balfour/Lumsden
 Bluff
 Central Pirates
 Collegiate
 Drummond Limehills Star (DLS)
 Eastern Northern Barbarians
 Edendale
 Invercargill (Blues)
 Marist
 Mataura
 Midlands
 Mossburn
 Ohai-Nightcaps
 Otautau
 Pioneer
 Pirates-Old Boys
 Pukerau
 Riversdale
 Riverton
 Star
 Te Anau
 Tokanui
 Waiau Star
 Waikaia
 Waikaka White Star
 Waikiwi
 Wakatipu Wanderers 1
 Woodlands
 Wrights Bush 2
 Wyndham

1  Wakatipu play in the Otago Country competition, however due to lack of suitable competition their B team play in the Southlandwide competition as the Wakatipu Wanderers. Wakatipu High School also compete in Southland competition as it involves less travel than the corresponding Otago competition.

2  Wrights Bush do not currently have their own senior team, instead playing as Bush Pirates in a combined venture with Central Pirates.

Galbraith Shield Champions 
The Galbraith Shield is the Southland club rugby premiership competition. For most of the shield's history only town (Invercargill) clubs have contested it, until 1990 when town and country clubs came together for a Southland-wide competition.

High Schools Rugby 

 Aurora College
 Central Southland College
 Gore High School
 James Hargest College
 Menzies College
 Northern Southland College
 Southland Boys' High School
 Southland Girls' High School
 St Peter's College, Gore
 Te Wharekura o Arowhenua
 Verdon College
 Wakatipu High School

Bunnings NPC

Southland in Super Rugby
Southland are one of three home unions to make up the Highlanders Super Rugby team, the other two unions being Otago and North Otago. There is currently an agreement in place for the Highlanders to play one regular season game per year at Rugby Park Stadium. Despite their interests in the Highlanders, Southland players are free to play for whichever Super team contracts them, with those who aren't contracted often representing the Highlanders development team known as the Bravehearts. This has seen players such as former player Wharenui Hawera represent the ACT Brumbies. The players from the 2021 Stags squad with Super Rugby experience are:
 Ethan de Groot
 Highlanders:  2020–present (14 caps)
 Greg Pleasants-Tate
 Blues: 2015 (1 cap)
 Highlanders: 2016-18 (18 caps)
 Marty McKenzie
 Blues: 2013 (3 caps)
 Chiefs: 2015, 2018-19 (20 caps) 
 Crusaders: 2016-17 (9 caps)
 Tony Lamborn 
 Blues: 2020 (9 caps)
 Lisati Milo-Harris
 Chiefs: 2020 (3 caps)
 Josh Renton
 Highlanders: 2015-18 (6 caps)
 Marty Banks
 Hurricanes:  2014 (5 caps)
 Highlanders: 2015-17, 2019, 2022–present (40 caps)
 Solomon Alaimalo
 Chiefs: 2017-20 (44 caps)
 Highlanders: 2021–present (1 cap)

Honours
NPC South Island Second Division
Champions: 1982, 1984
NPC Second Division
Champions: 1989, 1994, 1996
Air New Zealand Cup
Semifinalists: 2008, 2009
Ranfurly Shield
1920, 1929, 1937, 1938, 1959, 2009, 2011

Captains
Southland's Captains since 1976 are:

D Saunders 1976, 1978–79
Frank Oliver 1977
Brian McKechnie 1979, 1982–83
Ken Stewart 1980-81
Paul Macfie 1984-85
Trevor Bokser 1986-87
Murray Brown 1988-90
David Henderson 1991-92, 1994–95
Paul Henderson 1993
Simon Culhane 1996-97
Davin Heaps 1998
Brett McCormack 1999
Brendon Timmons 2000-01
Steve Jackson 2002-03
Clarke Dermody 2004-07
Jamie Mackintosh 2008–15
Brayden Mitchell 2016–17
Flynn Thomas & James Wilson 2018–19
Tony Lamborn 2020–present

Coaches
Southland's Coaches Since 1976 are:

Bob Donnelly 1976
Jack Smith 1977-79
Robin Archer 1980-82
Jack Borland, Harold Miller & Kevin Laidlaw 1983
Laidlaw 1984-85
John McAlley 1986-87
Barry Leonard 1988-92
Keith Robertson 1993-97
Robert Telfer 1998-99
Leicester Rutledge 2000-01
Phil Young 2002-04
Simon Culhane & David Henderson 2005-11
Henderson 2012-13
Brad Mooar 2014-15
Hoani MacDonald 2016–17
Dave Hewett 2018–19
Dale MacLeod 2020—present

Rugby Southland centurions
The following players have played over a hundred games for the Southland senior team. Listed in chronological order from Ack Soper in 1966 to most recently Tim Boys in 2014 the 15 are:
Ack Soper - Country Pirates (103 games)
Greg Spencer - Pirates (107 games)
Gerald Dermody - Tokanui (120 games)
Lin Booth - Star (100 games)
Phil Butt - Star (100 games)
Leicester Rutledge - Wrights Bush (113 games)
Paul Laidlaw - Nightcaps (105 games)
Brent Shepard - Woodlands (103 games)
Simon Culhane - Invercargill (105 games)
Jason Rutledge - Woodlands (138 games)
Jimmy Cowan - Mataura (111 games)
Jamie Mackintosh - Woodlands (123 games*)
David Hall - Pirates-Old Boys (108 games)
Josh Bekhuis - Star (115 games)
Tim Boys - Midlands (120 games)

* denotes player has not yet retired

All Blacks
There have been 58 players selected for the All Blacks whilst playing their club rugby in Southland. 
The first being Nisbet McRobie in 1896 and the most recent being Ethan de Groot in 2021.

N McRobie 
CA Purdue
JW Stead 
GF Burgess
E Purdue
E Hughes 
DC Hamilton 
AJ Ridland
J McNeece
WG Lindsay 
DL Baird 
A White 
JR Bell
JA Archer 
WE Hazlett 
GT Alley 
JH Geddes 
J Howden 
TC Metcalfe 
GB Purdue
NA Mitchell 
RH Ward
VL George 
JA McRae 
TA Budd
LS Connolly 
TRD Webster 
WA McCaw 
CE Robinson
AL Wilson 
AJ Soper 
JR Watt 
DL Ashby 
KF Laidlaw 
EJ Hazlett 
KW Stewart 
RJ Barber 
FJ Oliver 
BJ McKechnie 
LM Rutledge 
AA McGregor
GT Valli
ST Pokere
PW Henderson
NJ Hewitt
SD Culhane
QJ Cowan
C Dermody
JL Mackintosh
LZ Sopoaga
EC Dixon
E de Groot

Other notable players

  Edward J Kavanagh
  Adedayo Adebayo
  Pita Alatini
  Seremaia Bai
  Josh Bekhuis
  Graeme Bond
  Lex Chisholm
  Eion Crossan
  Gus Dermody
  Mal Dermody
  Lio Falaniko
  Philippe Farner 
  Pailate Fili
  Corey Flynn
  Simon Forrest
  John Hardie
  Wharenui Hawera
  Ben Herring
  David Gannon
  Les George
  David Hill
  Damian Hopley
  George Konia
  Kevin Laidlaw
  George Latu 
  Norman Ligairi
  Justin Marshall
  Joe McDonnell
  Jack JT McKenzie
  Harold Miller
  Paul Miller
  Wayne Miller
  Bobby Murrell
  Roger Newell
  Matt Philip
  Peni Ravai
  Peter Ryan
  Charlie Saxton
  Mark Seymour
  Brent Shepherd
  Alando Soakai
  Jeremy Spence
  Billy Stead
  Ack Soper
  Hale T-Pole
  Kel Tremain
  Talemaitoga Tuapati
  Joe Tuineau
  Des Tuiavi'i
  Earl Va'a
  To'o Vaega
  Geoff Valli
  Jeff Wilson

References

External links
Official site
Southland rugby (NZHistory.net.nz)

New Zealand rugby union teams
New Zealand rugby union governing bodies
Sport in Southland, New Zealand